Andrew Wilkinson  is a Professor Emeritus of Paediatrics and Perinatal Medicine at All Souls College, Oxford.  Wilkinson is most notable for being an international authority in neonatology and a lead author of the Standards of Care for NICU and NICE  guidelines on retinopathy of prematurity.

Life
Wilkinson took his clinical training at University of Birmingham Medical School, achieving a MB BCh in 1968.

Career
Wilkinson's first position was a house officer in medicine and surgery at City Hospital, Birmingham. In 1969 Wilkinson moved to Warwick Hospital, where he began to specialise in paediatrics.  In 1970, Wilkinson was promoted to senior house officer with positions at Birmingham, Warwick, and King Edward VII's Hospital. In 1973, Wilkinson took a position at Great Ormond Street Hospital. In the same year, he was promoted to registrar at Southampton General Hospital. From 1974 to 1975, Wilkinson became a Nuffield Medical Research Fellow at the University of Oxford. Wilkinson then spent two years in the US, as a visiting Fellow at the University of California, San Francisco at the Cardiovascular Research Institute. Returning in 1978 he became a clinical lecturer in paediatrics at the University of Oxford. In 1981, Wilkinson was promoted to consultant paediatrician and worked within the Oxford University Hospitals NHS Foundation Trust until 1992. From 1992 to 1997 Wilkinson was clinical reader at the University of Oxford. In 2011, Wilkinson was elected to be an Emeritus Fellow at All Souls College, Oxford

Societies
From 1983 to 1989, Wilkinson was the Honorary Secretary and Chair of the Academic Board of the Royal College of Paediatrics and Child Health. From 1999 to 2002 Wilkinson was President of the British Association of Perinatal Medicine. From 2003 to 2006 Wilkinson was President of the Neonatal Society.

Bibliography
The following are the most cited papers that Wilkinson contributed to.

Awards and honours
 Knight, 1st Class, Order of the White Rose of Finland 2003
 James Spence Medal, 2011

References

British paediatricians
Officers of the Order of the British Empire
Recipients of the James Spence Medal
Fellows of All Souls College, Oxford
Order of the White Rose of Finland
Living people
Year of birth missing (living people)